β-LGND2, also known as ERβ-selective ligand 2 or as GTx-878, is a synthetic nonsteroidal estrogen and selective ERβ agonist which was under development by GTx for the treatment of benign prostatic hyperplasia, prostatitis, and rheumatoid arthritis but was never marketed. It shows approximately 25-fold selectivity for activation of the ERβ over the ERα ( = 2 nM and 52 nM, respectively). β-LGND2 is an isoquinolinone derivative.

References

External links
 GTx-878 - AdisInsight

Abandoned drugs
Bromoarenes
Isoquinolines
Ketones
Phenols
Selective ERβ agonists
Synthetic estrogens
Triols